Gold Beach Municipal Airport  is a public use airport located in Gold Beach, a city in Curry County, Oregon, United States. It is owned by the Port of Gold Beach. This airport is included in the National Plan of Integrated Airport Systems for 2011–2015, which categorized it as a general aviation facility.

Facilities and aircraft 
Gold Beach Municipal Airport covers an area of 48 acres (19 ha) at an elevation of 20 feet (6 m) above mean sea level. It has one runway designated 16/34 with an asphalt surface measuring 3,237 by 75 feet (987 x 23 m).

For the 12-month period ending June 1, 2010, the airport had 5,550 aircraft operations, an average of 15 per day: 83% general aviation, 14% air taxi, and 3% military.
At that time there were 13 aircraft based at this airport: 92% single-engine and 8% ultralight.

References

External links 
 Gold Beach Airport at Port of Gold Beach
 Aerial image as of May 1994 from USGS The National Map
 

Airports in Curry County, Oregon
Gold Beach, Oregon